Andorra participated in the Eurovision Song Contest 2005 with the song "La mirada interior" written by Rafael Artesero, Daniel Aragay and Rafa Fernández. The song was performed by Marian van de Wal. The Andorran broadcaster Ràdio i Televisió d'Andorra (RTVA) organised the national final Desitja'm sort in order to select the Andorran entry for the 2005 contest in Kyiv, Ukraine. The national final took place over three stages and two televised shows, resulting in the selection of Marian van de Wal as the winning artist on 19 December 2004 and "La mirada interior" as the winning song on 22 January 2005.

Andorra competed in the semi-final of the Eurovision Song Contest which took place on 19 May 2005. Performing during the show in position 18, "La mirada interior" was not announced among the top 10 entries of the semi-final and therefore did not qualify to compete in the final. It was later revealed that Andorra placed twenty-third out of the 25 participating countries in the semi-final with 27 points.

Background 

The Andorran national broadcaster, Ràdio i Televisió d'Andorra (RTVA), broadcasts the event within Andorra and organises the selection process for the nation's entry. RTVA confirmed their intentions to participate at the 2005 Eurovision Song Contest on 3 September 2004. In 2004, RTVA had set up the national final 12 Punts in collaboration with Catalan broadcaster Televisió de Catalunya (TVC). The national final procedure was continued for their 2005 entry but without the collaboration with TVC.

Before Eurovision

Desitja'm sort 
Desitja'm sort (Wish me luck) was the national final organised by RTVA that selected Andorra's entry for the Eurovision Song Contest 2005. The competition consisted of two shows held on 19 December 2004 and 22 January 2005, respectively. Both shows were hosted by Meri Picart and Josep Lluís Trabal and broadcast on ATV.

Format 
The selection of the Andorran Eurovision entry took place over three stages. The first stage, entitled Eurocàsting, took place between 24 October and 10 December 2004 and involved 32 candidates being presented to the public via postcard specials. Three artists were ultimately selected to proceed to the second stage of the competition. The second stage was the artist selection which took place during the first televised show of Desitja'm sort on 19 December 2004. The winning artist proceeded to the third stage, the song selection, which took place during the second televised show of Desitja'm sort on 22 January 2005 and featured three candidate Eurovision songs all performed by the artist. The results of all stages were determined by a combination of votes from a professional jury and a public vote via SMS. The artist selection featured five jury members and the song selection featured seven jury members. Each juror had an equal stake in the final result, while the public vote had a weighting equal to the votes of two jurors. In the event of a tie, the tie was resolved by the youngest jury member.

Eurocàsting 
Auditions for Eurocàsting took place between 24 and 26 October 2004 at the Fira d'Andorra in Andorra la Vella. Applicants were required to be aged at least 16, have Andorran citizenship or residency as of 2000 and fluency in Catalan. 32 applicants that attended the auditions were presented to the public during introductory shows broadcast between 2 and 23 November 2004 on the ATV programme Diagonal, hosted by Gemma Rial, and the top 16 candidates qualified for the next stage following the combination of votes from a professional jury and a public vote that registered over 5,000 votes, which were announced on 25 November 2004 during Diagonal. The 16 candidates were further presented on Diagonal until 8 December 2004 and the top three candidates qualified for the final following the combination of votes from the jury and public vote that registered 7,500 votes, which were announced on 10 December 2004 during Diagonal.

Shows

Show 1 (Artist selection) 
The first show of Desitja'm sort took place on 19 December 2004 at the Centre de Congressos in Andorra la Vella. The running order of the three finalists was announced by RTVA on 13 December 2004. Each of the finalists performed a ballad and an uptempo song in Catalan and the winner, Marian van de Wal, was selected by the combination of votes from a five-member professional jury (5/7) and a public vote (2/7). Marian van de Wal and Mar Capdevila were tied at 3 points each but the tie was resolved after the youngest jury member declared Marian van de Wal the winner. In addition to the performances of the finalists, the show featured an interval act from singer Joan Tena.

Show 2 (Song selection) 
Following a song submission period where songwriters were required to submit songs in Catalan, three songs were selected for Marian van de Wal by an expert committee and announced on 30 December 2004. The three songs were presented to the public during the second show of Desitja'm sort that took place on 22 January 2005 at the Centre Cultural i de Congressos Lauredià in Sant Julià de Lòria and the winning song, "La mirada interior", was selected by the combination of votes from a seven-member professional jury (7/9) and a public vote (2/9). In addition to the performances of the competing songs, the show featured an interval act from Eurovision Song Contest 2004 winner Ruslana.

Preparation 
Following the Andorran national final, Marian van de Wal filmed the music video for "La mirada interior" during early March 2005 in Andorra la Vella, Canillo and Engolasters. The video together with a revamped version of the song was presented on 21 March 2005 during the ATV programme +MU.SI.K, hosted by Meri Picart. 

Lyrically, the song is about the fact that one has to find beauty in themselves before they can find beauty in the wider world.

Promotion 
Marian van de Wal specifically promoted "La mirada interior" as the Andorran Eurovision entry on 2 March 2005 by performing the song during the Greek Eurovision national final Eurovision Party.

At Eurovision
According to Eurovision rules, all nations with the exceptions of the host country, the "Big Four" (France, Germany, Spain and the United Kingdom) and the ten highest placed finishers in the 2004 contest are required to qualify from the semi-final on 19 May 2005 in order to compete for the final on 21 May 2005; the top ten countries from the semi-final progress to the final. On 22 March 2005, a special allocation draw was held which determined the running order for the semi-final and Andorra was set to perform in position 18, following the entry from Macedonia and before the entry from Switzerland.

The semi-final and the final were broadcast in Andorra on ATV with commentary by Meri Picart and Josep Lluís Trabal. The Andorran spokesperson, who announced the Andorran votes during the final, was Ruth Gumbau.

Semi-final 

Marian van de Wal took part in technical rehearsals on 13 and 15 May, followed by dress rehearsals on 18 and 19 May. The Andorran performance featured Marian van de Wal wearing an 18th-century-style green dress, joined on stage by three backing vocalists wearing green dresses and two shirtless dancers wearing black pants. Van de Wal and the backing vocalists performed simple choreography while the dancers moved around the stage in a more complex way while holding black feathers. The two dancers that joined Marian van de Wal were Jose Ortiz and Oscar Soto, while the three backing vocalists were Anabel Conde, Rebeka Brown and Yolanda Cikara. Anabel Conde previously represented Spain in the Eurovision Song Contest 1995.

At the end of the show, Andorra was not announced among the top 10 entries in the semi-final and therefore failed to qualify to compete in the final. It was later revealed that Andorra placed twenty-third in the semi-final, receiving a total of 27 points.

Voting 
Between 1998 and 2008, the voting was calculated by 100% televoting from viewers across Europe. However, in 2005 the EBU introduced an undisclosed threshold number of televotes that would have to be registered in each voting country in order to make that country's votes valid. If that number was not reached, the country's backup jury would vote instead. In both the semi-final and final of the contest, this affected several countries including Andorra. Therefore, the country had to use a backup jury panel to calculate the Andorran results. This jury judged each entry based on: vocal capacity; the stage performance; the song's composition and originality; and the overall impression of the act. In addition, no member of a national jury was permitted to be related in any way to any of the competing acts in such a way that they cannot vote impartially and independently.

Below is a breakdown of points awarded to Andorra and awarded by Andorra in the semi-final and grand final of the contest. The nation awarded its 12 points to Israel in the semi-final and to Spain in the final of the contest. Andorra also notably awarded 10 points to fellow microstate Monaco in the semi-final of the contest.

Points awarded to Andorra

Points awarded by Andorra

References

2005
Countries in the Eurovision Song Contest 2005
Eurovision